Raj Bahadur Budha is a Nepalese politician, belonging to the Communist Party of Nepal (Unified Marxist-Leninist). In the 2008 Constituent Assembly election he was elected from the Dailekh-2 constituency, winning 16292 votes.

References

Living people
Communist Party of Nepal (Unified Marxist–Leninist) politicians
Year of birth missing (living people)
Members of the 1st Nepalese Constituent Assembly